The AT&T Center is a 19-story, 213 foot tall neo-gothic building in downtown Milwaukee, Wisconsin. Construction began in 1918 for Wisconsin Telephone and was completed in 1924. It houses the AT&T Wisconsin headquarters.

References

Skyscraper office buildings in Milwaukee
AT&T buildings
Office buildings completed in 1924